Great Falls may refer to:

Communities
 Great Falls, Montana
 Somersworth, New Hampshire or Great Falls
 Great Falls, South Carolina
 Great Falls, Virginia
 Great Falls Park

Waterfalls
 Great Falls (Hamilton, Ontario), Canada
 Great Falls (Connecticut River), New Hampshire and Vermont, United States
 Great Falls (Housatonic River), Connecticut, United States
 Great Falls (Potomac River), Maryland and Virginia, United States
 Great Falls (Missouri River), Montana, United States
 Great Falls (Passaic River), New Jersey, United States
 Celilo Falls or Great Falls, Columbia River, Oregon and Washington, United States
 Great Falls (Catawba River), South Carolina, United States